The Hot Touch (also credited as Hot Touch) is a 1981 Canadian crime comedy film directed by Roger Vadim.

This caper film is set in the world of art forgery. An accomplished art forger and a businessman have for many years been successful in a company which authenticates paintings before they are auctioned. They are discovered by an art dealer and blackmailed into forging paintings which disappeared in the Second World War. Procedural detail around the act of forgery is exploited for high-rolling glamour.
The Hot Touch was the final film appearance of veteran Academy Award-winning actor Melvyn Douglas.

Cast
Wayne Rogers as Danny Fairchild 
Marie-France Pisier as Dr. Simpson 
Lloyd Bochner as Severo 
Samantha Eggar as Samantha O'Brien 
Patrick Macnee as Vincent Reyblack 
Melvyn Douglas as Max Reich

References

External links
 

1981 films
Films directed by Roger Vadim
Films about art forgery
Canadian crime comedy films
French-language Canadian films
1980s English-language films
1980s Canadian films